The Caucones  ( Kaukônes) were an autochthonous tribe of Anatolia (modern-day Turkey), who later migrated to parts of the Greek mainland (Arcadia, Triphylian Pylos and Elis). 

The phonology of the name Caucones may be evidence that they originated in the Caucasus Mountains. 

Hittite tablets mention a kaz-kaz people who lived along the southern shore of the Black Sea – where Homer's Iliad placed the Kaukônes. According to Herodotus and other classical writers, the Caucones were displaced or absorbed by the Bithynians, who had migrated from Thrace. This suggests that the Bithynians spoke an Indo-European language, such as Thracian, while the Caucones did not. (The Bithynians also expelled or absorbed other autochthonous tribes, such as the Mysians, although one – the Mariandyni – maintained their cultural independence, in an area that became north-east Bithynia. Strabo [12.3.3] states that in earlier times the Bithynians were known as Mysians. Herodotus [7.20, 75] says that some time before the Trojan War, the Mysians, alongside the Teucrians, invaded Thessaly.) 

The Caucones appear in the Iliad Book X, when the Trojan herald Dolon reveals the array of Trojan allies, ranged among their neighbors like a lesson in geography: "Towards the sea lie the Karians, and Paionians of the bent bow, and the Leleges and Caucones, and noble Pelasgians." Caucones in Book XX were polemon meta thôrêssonto, "equipping themselves for war," as allies of the Trojans, when in a lighter moment, the hero Aeneas fell into their midst, saved by Poseidon from certain death in direct combat with the mighty Greek hero Achilles. Aeneas moves west in time receiving honors from Vergil among the founders of the Roman Empire. Recognition of the Caucones as deserving a place in the Neleiad kingdom in southwestern Greece occurs in later epic. Efforts were made, we are told by Pausanias (4.1.5). to 'historicize' Kaukon as the early ancestor of the Athenian genos Lykomidai around 480 BC by inventing a grandson of an earth-born Phlyus named Kaukon who taught the Eleusinian Mysteries to a royal queen Messene. His name was Kaukon, a teacher of religious rites.

In the Odyssey (3.366), Athena tells Nestor at Pylos in preparation for an ox sacrifice that she will secure the offering locally: "I'll go to the Caucones, where there's an old debt still owing me, not a small amount." This allusion may refer to northern inhabitants in Elis, from Bouprasion to Dyme, that Strabo's evidence claimed were Caucones. Their penetration beyond Arkadia (Strabo 7.7.1–2) and their claims to be sons of Lycaon or Lycos (Apollodorus, Library 3.8.1) explains their enduring presence over time in literature. Pausanias' description of the carved figure of Caucon holding a lyre atop his tomb speaks to their tribal poetic literacy. Several scholars believed Pylian Caucones (Hdt. 4.148, 1.147, 5.65) brought Neleid legends and Nestor's polemic exhortations to Kolophon. Mimnermus (fr. 9, 14–15, Strabo 14.1.3–4) their ancestor extended the traditional royal "we" of Homeric Nestor in his words of inspiration to Smyrnaeans fighting Lydian Gyges in the Hermus plain (Paus. 4.21.2, quoted by Theoclus, Paus. 5.8.7, 9.29.4). 

A Bronze Age titular figure of Kukunnis (KWKWN), son of Lycos (RWQQ), left an inscribed hieroglyphic obelisk, known as the "Abishemu obelisk", for the governor of Byblos; and, as ruler of Wilusa (Ilion), he was commanded in correspondence by Hittite Muwatalli II (father of Mursili III), to "adopt an heir" named Alaksandu for the throne.

Strabo (8.3.14–15) in discussing Triphylian Pylos lists Caucones once inhabiting Lepreion as does Pausanias (5.5.5), a settlement that may have had custody over Hades-Demeter shrines at Mt. Minthe that grew mint used for the kukeiôn at Eleusis (Homer, Hymn to Demeter 209: glêkhôni). These Caucones enter history with their expulsion (Hdt.4.148) and dispersion to Athens (Paus. 2.18.7–8, 7.2.1–5) and Ionian Miletos (Hdt. 1.146-7), after contributing to the spread of the Eleusinian Great Goddesses into Messenia and Thebes (Paus.4.1.5–9), Ephesos and Kolophon (Strabo 14.1.3). With these passages Pausanias affirms Herodotus (2.51) on the spread of Hermes and a cult of Kabeiroi throughout Attika under Hipparchus between 528–514 BC employing inscribed square-cut figures of Hermes in marble as road markers (Plato, Hipparchus 228b–229b). A Caucon priest Methapus had done much the same at Thebes. The Milesian Caucones, according to Herodotus (1.147), possessed ancestry from Pylian Codrus, son of Melanthos, the very same genealogy Herodotus (5.65) assigns to the Athenian tyrant Peisistratos. Strabo (12.3.5) reported Caucones once inhabiting the southern Black Sea coast from Heraclea Pontica (modern Karadeniz Ereğli) to Carambis promontory at Teion, on the Parthenios River, their likely Homeric geography (Iliad 20.328–9).

The Caucones are not to be confused with the Cicones (also mentioned in the Iliad and the Odyssey), who were a Thracian tribe on the south coast of Thrace.

References

Ancient peoples of Anatolia
Greek mythology
Hellenistic-era tribes in the Balkans
Legendary tribes in Greco-Roman historiography
Ancient tribes in Greece